Kimarcus was a legendary king of the Britons according to Geoffrey of Monmouth.  He was the son of Sisillius I and was succeeded by Gorboduc. Geoffrey has nothing to say of him beyond this.

References

Legendary British kings